The Crystal Cup European Cross Country Challenge  is an annual series of steeplechase horse races in Europe. The series was introduced in 2010 although most of the individual races are much older.

Points are awarded to the first six finishers in each race, with bonuses for horses from abroad and for the final race. The main prize is for the trainer whose stable's horses have accumulated the most points, with additional trophies for the top horse and top jockey.

References

External links
 

Steeplechase (horse racing)
Horse racing in Europe
Sports competition series
Recurring sporting events established in 2010
2010 establishments in Europe
Racehorse training awards
Racing series for horses